Acacia peregrinalis, also known as New Guinea salwood, is a tree belonging to the genus Acacia and the subgenus Juliflorae that is native to New Guinea.

It is found in areas of savannah, monsoon forest or rain forest in areas that are flooded during the wet season where it grows in stony or sandy soils.

See also
List of Acacia species

References

peregrinalis
Flora of New Guinea
Taxa named by Bruce Maslin
Plants described in 2002